Hurricane Ismael was a weak, but deadly Pacific hurricane that killed over one hundred people in northern Mexico in September of the 1995 Pacific hurricane season. It developed from a persistent area of deep convection on September 12, and steadily strengthened as it moved to the north-northwest. Ismael rapidly weakened over land, and dissipated on September 16 over northwestern Mexico. The remnants entered the United States and extended eastward into the Mid-Atlantic States.

Hundreds of fishermen were unprepared for the hurricane, which was expected to move more slowly, and as a result 52 ships were wrecked, killing 57 fishermen. On land, Ismael caused 59 deaths in mainland Mexico and resulted in $26 million in damage (1995 USD$,   USD). The hurricane destroyed thousands of houses, leaving 30,000 people homeless. Moisture from the storm extended into the United States, causing heavy rainfall and localized moderate damage in southeastern New Mexico.

Meteorological history

It moved west-northwestward, and after three days without further organization a circulation developed off the southwest coast of Mexico. The system quickly organized, resulting in Dvorak classifications beginning later that day. The depression moved to the northwest, and following an increase in deep convection it intensified into Tropical Storm Ismael early on September 13.
Upon attaining tropical storm status, Ismael was located in an area of warm water temperatures with well-established upper-level outflow. Initially the storm moved to the northwest, though in response to the interaction with an upper-level low over Baja California Ismael gradually turned to the north. Such a change in motion was not operationally predicted by forecasters, though they noted uncertainty in Ismael's track due to the low. However, the outflow remained well-organized as it remained over warm waters.

Steered between a mid- to upper-level trough to its west and a ridge to its east, Ismael accelerated as it moved just west of due north. The hurricane maintained its strength as it continued northward, and made landfall on Topolobampo in the state of Sinaloa on September 15. The remnants of Ismael continued northward, and moisture from the storm extended over the southwestern United States eastward through the Mid-Atlantic States.

Preparations
Initially, Hurricane Ismael was predicted to remain over the open waters of the Pacific Ocean. However, when a northward motion became apparent, the government of Mexico issued a tropical storm warning from Manzanillo, Colima, to Cabo Corrientes, Jalisco and for the Islas Marias. Shortly thereafter, the warning was extended to Los Mochis and issued for the eastern coast of Baja California Sur south of 25° N. Ten hours before Ismael made its final landfall, the Mexican government issued a hurricane warning from Mazatlán to Los Mochis. Prior to the arrival of the hurricane, 1,572 people evacuated to five emergency shelters.

Impact

Hurricane Ismael produced  waves over the Gulf of California and coastal waters off of Mexico. The hurricane, which was forecast to move more slowly, left hundreds of fishermen unprepared due to deficient communications between the boats and harbor authorities. As a result, 52 boats were wrecked, of which 20 sank. 57 fishermen died offshore, with dozens washing ashore as the high tides receded. About 150 fishermen survived the storm by waiting on islands, sandbars, or disabled fishing boats. Navy rescue teams and other fishermen searched for days off the Mexican coast to find victims and survivors from the storm.

In one municipality, the passage of the hurricane destroyed 373 cardboard houses and damaged 4,790 others. The passage of the hurricane left 177 houses without drinking water and left four municipalities without power.
Damage was heaviest where the hurricane made landfall. In Los Mochis, the winds from Ismael knocked down houses and telephone poles, though no deaths were reported. 59 people were killed in Sinaloa.

Severe flooding was reported in Huatabampo. The hurricane directly affected 24,111 people in 8 municipalities. Throughout Sonora, the strong winds destroyed 4,728 houses and removed the roofs of 6,827 homes. The hurricane also destroyed 107 schools and 2 health centers in the state. The passage of Hurricane Ismael damaged high-tension power lines and cable lines, causing interruptions to the communication system. Damage in Sonora amounted to $8.6 million (1995 USD, $50 million 1995 MXN, $  USD).

Throughout Mexico the hurricane left 30,000 people homeless. Including offshore casualties, Ismael caused at least 116 deaths and damage totaling to $26 million (1995 USD, $197 million 1995 MXN, $  USD).

Moisture from the remnants of Ismael extended into southwestern Arizona and southern New Mexico. The rainfall led to flooding of roads and buildings. Multiple highways and railroads were closed due to washouts. Damaged totaled to $250,000 (1995 USD) in New Mexico. In Lubbock, Texas, the rainfall led to flash flooding, closing many intersections and roads. There, the rainfall helped to relieve drought conditions.

Aftermath
Following the passage of the hurricane, reinforcement workers quickly repaired the communication network, and other workers distributed aid to victims in Sonora. The Mexican government allocated about $ (1995 USD$,  1995 MXN, $  USD) in funds for the restoration of houses and the overall infrastructure. Officials distributed 4,800 sheets, 500 cushions, and 1,500 blankets to hurricane victims. All sunken ships and drowned bodies were ultimately recovered by divers.

Due to the damage and deaths, the World Meteorological Organization retired the name Ismael and replaced it with Israel, another Spanish name beginning with the letter "I" set to be used in the 2001 Pacific hurricane season. During the 2001 season, a reporter stationed in Israel felt offended from the name choice, and the president of the Anti-Defamation League felt it was insensitive. Hundreds of people sent e-mails or called the National Hurricane Center, and as a result Max Mayfield called the members of the World Meteorological Organization. The name Israel was replaced with Ivo during the season.

See also

 List of Pacific hurricanes
 List of retired Pacific hurricane names

References

External links

 National Hurricane Center Preliminary Report on Hurricane Ismael
 July 30, 1996 Mexican Government Report on Hurricane Ismael

Ismael
Ismael
Ismael
1995 in Mexico
1995 natural disasters in the United States
Ismael
Ismael
Ismael
Ismael
Ismael
Ismael
1995 in Arkansas
1995 in Texas
1995 in Oklahoma